Saint-Christophe is a town and comune in the Aosta Valley.  It is located east of Aosta, on the left shore of the Dora Baltea.

Places of interest 
The Passerin d'Entrèves castle is located in this commune.

The Bridge of Grand Arvou is in the Aosta commune nearby.

Transport
Aosta Airport is located in Saint-Christophe. Air Vallée had its head office on the grounds of Aosta Airport.

Twinnings
 Bellegarde-sur-Valserine, France

See also

A.S.D. Vallée d’Aoste Saint-Christophe

References

External links

Saint-Christophe 

Cities and towns in Aosta Valley